Cowdin is a surname. Notable people with the surname include:

Elliot Cowdin (1819–1880), American businessman and politician
Elliott Christopher Cowdin II (1886–1933), American WWI veteran
John Cheever Cowdin (1889–1960), American financier and polo player
John Elliot Cowdin (1858–1941), American polo player
Robert Cowdin (1805–1874), American businessman, Civil War veteran, and politician